William H. Dutton is former Director of the Oxford Internet Institute, Professor of Internet Studies, University of Oxford, and Fellow of Balliol College. He also has a chair in Michigan State University's Department of Media and Information, where he is Quello Professor of Media and Information Policy. He was previously a Professor in the Annenberg School for Communication at the University of Southern California, which he joined in 1980, where he was elected President of the Faculty.

Books
William H.Dutton has written a number of books on the societal implications of computing and telecommunication, such as the Internet, including:
Social Transformation in an Information Society (UNESCO 2004);
Society on the Line: Information Politics in the Digital Age (Oxford, 1999); 
Modeling as Negotiating: The Political Dynamics of Computer Models in the Policy Process (Ablex, 1985); and 
Computers and Politics (Oxford, 1982).

Edited books
Dutton also edited or co-edited several influential books, including:
Wired Cities: Shaping the Future of Communications (G.K. Hall, 1987);
Information and Communication Technologies: Visions and Realities (Oxford, 1996); and
Digital Academe: The New Media and Institutions of Higher Education and Learning (Routledge, 2002); 
Transforming Enterprise: The Economic and Social Implications of Information Technology (MIT, 2005); and Society and the Internet: How Networks of Information and Communication are Changing Our Lives (Oxford, 2014).

References

External links

 William H. Dutton OII home page and blog
 William H. Dutton Annenberg School for Communication home page

1947 births
Living people
Fellows of Balliol College, Oxford
Statutory Professors of the University of Oxford
University of Southern California faculty